Leigh is a town in the Metropolitan Borough of Wigan, Greater Manchester, England.  The town, together with its suburbs of Bedford, Westleigh and Pennington, contains 33 listed buildings that are recorded in the National Heritage List for England.  Of these, four are listed at Grade II*, the middle of the three grades, and the others are at Grade II, the lowest grade.

Leigh is an industrial town, its main industry being textiles.  The industries were supplied by the Bridgewater Canal and the Leeds and Liverpool Canal which make a junction in the town, and a bridge crossing the Bridgewater Canal is listed.  Some textile mills and warehouses have survived and are listed.  The other listed buildings include houses, farmhouses and farm buildings, churches and associated structures, public houses, an obelisk, banks, civic buildings, and war memorials.


Key

Buildings

References

Citations

Sources

Lists of listed buildings in Greater Manchester
Buildings and structures in Leigh, Greater Manchester